Glenn D'Hollander (born 28 December 1974) is a Belgian former professional road bicycle racer. Fellow professional cyclist Greg Van Avermaet is his brother-in-law.

Palmarès 

1991
 2nd, National U17 Road Race Championship
1992
  U19 Time Trial Champion
1994
 3rd, National Amateur Road Race Championship
1995
 1st, GP Bodson
 1st, Stage 3, Triptyque Ardennais
 1st, Stage 8, Tour de Wallonie
 3rd, Overall, Tour of Austria
1996
 1st, Schaal Sels
 1st, Stage 10, Tour of Austria
 3rd, Overall, Tour de l'Avenir
1997
 1st, Stage 6, Tour de Wallonie
1998
 1st, Eurode Omloop
1999
 2nd, Overall, Circuito Montañés
 Winner Stage 1
2001
 1st, Overall, Tour de Wallonie
 Winner Stage 3
 1st, Stage 1, UNIQA Classic
 3rd, National Time Trial Championship
2002
 1st, Stage 3, Étoile de Bessèges

References

1974 births
Living people
Belgian male cyclists
Sportspeople from Sint-Niklaas
Cyclists from East Flanders